Doctors for Cannabis Regulation (DFCR) is a 501(c)(3) non-profit organization which serves as a global voice for physicians and health professionals who support cannabis legalization and science-based regulation in the United States and abroad. DFCR promotes public education, global research, and advocacy to support legislative changes necessary for improved public health, social justice & consumer protections. DFCR was founded on September 30, 2015, by David L. Nathan.

Board members and experts work to change cannabis policy through public testimony, lectures, op-eds, media appearances, research, and support for legislation individually and as part of larger coalitions. Testimony has been given to legislators in California, Connecticut, Delaware, Illinois, Kansas, New Jersey, New York, Oregon, Rhode Island, South Carolina, Texas, Vermont, and the United States House of Representatives. DFCR's first major coverage came in April 2016 by The Washington Post where it made a notable break from other medical professional organizations by endorsing the legalization of cannabis for adult consumption, arguing that prohibition does far more harm to the public than good. On July 10, 2019, David L. Nathan testified before a subcommittee of the United States House Judiciary Committee in support of cannabis legalization.

In 2017 David L. Nathan and DFCR honorary board members, former Substance Abuse and Mental Health Services Administration's director H. Westley Clark and former U.S. Surgeon General Joycelyn Elders, co-published the first op-ed supportive of cannabis legalization in the American Journal of Public Health titled "The Physicians' Case for Marijuana Legalization."

As part of its initiative to change cannabis policy in the National Football League, DFCR working in conjunction with former NFL running back Mike James filed the first therapeutic use exemption with the league in May 2018, though it was ultimately denied. In April 2020 the NFL changed its policy regarding cannabis after signing a new collective bargaining agreement with the National Football League Players Association, decreasing but not eliminating penalties for players.

New York Governor Andrew Cuomo directed the state's Department of Health in 2018 to "conduct a study in consultation with other state agencies to review, including but not limited to, the health, criminal justice and economic impacts of a regulated marijuana program in the state of New York, including the implications for the state of New York resulting from marijuana legalization in surrounding states." The resulting commission report cited DFCR's Declaration of Principles and found that regulating cannabis "reduces risks and improves quality control and consumer protection."

See also
 Americans for Safe Access
 Drug Policy Alliance
 Marijuana Policy Project
 Law Enforcement Against Prohibition
 NORML (National Organization for the Reform of Marijuana Laws)
 Prohibition
 Students for Sensible Drug Policy
 War on Drugs

References

External links
Official website

Drug policy organizations based in the United States
Organizations established in 2015